Diana Basho (born 5 December 2000) is an Albanian swimmer. She competed in the women's 200 metre freestyle event at the 2017 World Aquatics Championships.

References

2000 births
Living people
Albanian female swimmers
Place of birth missing (living people)
Albanian female freestyle swimmers
Swimmers at the 2015 European Games
European Games competitors for Albania